Vincent Burrough Redstone (1853 - 26 April 1941) was a Suffolk historian who suggested to Edith Pretty that the Sutton Hoo Ship-burial should be excavated. He was a master of Woodbridge School and secretary of the Suffolk Institute of Archaeology. He retired from Woodbridge School in 1921 and spent the remainder of his life researching historical topics. He was particularly noted for his study of Huguenot settlement in Suffolk.

Career
Redstone's father came from Hampshire and was Master of Alton Workhouse. His father died two month's after the birth of his son, from Scarlet fever. Redstone had been brought up in an orphanage at Wanstead in Essex and trained to be a teacher at Winchester Training College. He returned to teach at Wanstead. In 1880 Redstone moved to Woodbridge to teach at Woodbridge school. in 1880 and took up the post of General English master and Commercial Subjects. He was later to become 2nd master at Woodbridge School.  He rapidly became a historian of note studying the archives of the Seckford Trust. He became a Fellow  of the Royal Historical Society and the Society of Antiquaries. With his daughters Lillian and Elsie, he was to build up a large reference on Suffolk history at the Seckford Library and in his adjacent house, which was widely consulted by a wide range of scholars. It was here that Basil Brown  was able to glean much of his information on the Saxon archaeology of Suffolk.

Meeting with Edith Pretty and the Sutton Hoo excavations
At the 1937 Woodbridge Flower Fete, at Woodbridge Abbey, Edith discussed the possibility of an excavation with Vincent Redstone.
Redstone then wrote to his friend Guy Maynard at Ipswich Museum that Mrs Pretty had invited him to lunch and would he accompany him "Mrs Pretty is very pleasing, intelligent JP’’ The luncheon  appears to have taken place on 26 July. Redstone took part in the excavations. In August 1939 he wrote with his daughter Lilian' an article in the Woodbridge Reporter asking Was it King Redwald? who was buried at Sutton Hoo.

Family
Vincent Redstone married Grace Linsey.  They lived at 3 Seckford Street, Woodbridge in the old Woodbridge School Masters House, which was adjacent to the  Seckford Library. They had three daughters. Lilian Jane Redstone (1885-1955) was the first archivist for East Suffolk  and Elsie became the Seckford Librarian in  Woodbridge.

References

Publications
 Bygone Woodbridge (1893)
 Annals of Wickham Market (1896)
 The Ancient House, Ipswich (1896)
 Redstone V.B (ed)  Memorials of Old Suffolk Bemrose & Sons, London, 1908
 Redstone, Vincent Burrough Calendar of pre-reformation wills, testaments, probates, administrations : registered at the probate office, Bury St. Edmunds
 Redstone, Vincent Burrough Records of Protestant dissenters in Suffolk (Woodbridge : G.Booth, 1912) (page images at HathiTrust; US access only)
Dutch and Huguenot Settlement of Ipswich. (1921) Huguenot Society of London.
 Redstone, Vincent Burrough The ship-money returns for the county of Suffolk, 1639-40 (harl. mss. 7, 540-7, 542). (Ipswich : W.E. Harrison, 1904), also by Suffolk Institute of Archaeology and Natural History and Suffolk (England) (page images at HathiTrust)

Bibliography
Obituary: Suffolk Institute of Archaeology 
Scarfe N (1958) Vincent Burrough Redstone, F.S.A.., F.R. Hist.Soc. 1853-1941 : Lilian Jane Restone, M.B.E., B.A. 1885-1955. Redstone Memorial Volume, Suffolk Records Society, Vol. 1. pp. 7–13.
Weaver M & C (1987) The Seckford Foundation : Four Hundred Years of a Tudor Foundation The Seckford Foundation, Woodbridge.  
Weaver M (1999) In the Beginning.... Saxon  The Newsletter of the Sutton Hoo Society, No.30. pp1–2.

Fellows of the Society of Antiquaries of London
Schoolteachers from Suffolk
1941 deaths
Sutton Hoo
1853 births